Fauvette may refer to:-

, a World War I patrol vessel of the French Navy, also saw service as Fauvette I
Breguet Br 905 Fauvette, a French glider
La fauvette du temple, an 1885 comic opera